Deb Shaughnessy (born December 19, 1960) is a former Republican member of the Michigan House of Representatives and mayor of Charlotte.

An alumna of Lansing Community College, Shaughnessy worked for the Michigan Department of Treasury and several legislators, including House Speaker Paul Hillegonds and Senate Majority Leader Dick Posthumus. She was elected to the Charlotte city council in 2001, and served as mayor from 2005 through 2009. She had also been a newspaper writer.

After defeating her for election in 2010, Shaughnessy lost her bid for re-election to Theresa Abed in 2012.

References

1960 births
Living people
Republican Party members of the Michigan House of Representatives
Politicians from Lansing, Michigan
Mayors of places in Michigan
People from Charlotte, Michigan
Women mayors of places in Michigan
Women state legislators in Michigan
21st-century American women